Henry Laurence was an Oxford college head in the 16th-century.

Laurence was  educated at Exeter College, Oxford, graduating B.A. in 1530 and M.A. in 1532. He was appointed a Fellow of Exeter in 1530. He was Rector of Exeter College from 1541 to 1543. He was also a priest.

References

Alumni of Exeter College, Oxford
Rectors of Exeter College, Oxford
16th-century English people
Fellows of Exeter College, Oxford